Daxin is a backdoor exploit discovered in late 2021 by Symantec researchers. It is considered highly sophisticated and is suspected to have been operational in espionage operations by the Chinese government for over a decade, targeting government agencies in Asia and Africa. It can be controlled from anywhere in the world, and its creators reportedly invested significant effort to make its communication blend in with network traffic.

References  

Spyware
Common trojan horse payloads
Computer network security
Rogue software
Security breaches
Deception